Sichuan Province was a province of the Yuan dynasty. It was established in 1294, after being split off from Shaanxi Province (Yuan dynasty). 

The area had previously been part of the Northern Song dynasty circuits Chengdufu, Zizhou, and Kuizhou.

The province was significantly smaller than today's Sichuan, although it includes portions of Chongqing Municipality, which would not be split off until 1997.

References

Provinces of the Yuan dynasty
History of Sichuan